Yvonne Boag (born 13 August 1954) is an Australian painter and printmaker whose work reflects the many places where she has lived and worked.

Biography and education
Boag was born in Glasgow in Scotland, and emigrated with her family to Australia in 1964. They settled in the remote industrial city of Port Pirie where she attended Port Pirie High School. Her art teacher, the ceramicist, Petrus Spronk, encouraged her to apply for entry to the South Australian School of Art in Adelaide. There she specialised in printmaking under Franz Kempf, graduating in 1976. In 1977 she moved to Melbourne where, at the Royal Melbourne Institute of Technology she was able to work alongside an outstanding generation of printmakers including George Baldessin, Tate Adams and John Loane, along with Neil Leveson at the Victorian (now Australian) Print Workshop.

In 1985, Boag moved to Sydney, where she exhibited with Australian Galleries and taught at  the National Art School, Sydney College of the Arts, Western Sydney University and the College of Fine Arts. During the 1990s she conducted annual printmaking workshops at the remote Aboriginal community of Lockhart River in northern Queensland. She also worked and travelled extensively. She was artist-in-residence at the Aberdeen Art Gallery in Scotland, spent five years in Paris (including a residency at the Moya Dyring Studio in the Cité internationale des arts), worked in the  Scuola Internazionale di Graphica in Venice, and was awarded the Australia Council's Japan Residency in 1998, having been Asialink's inaugural artist-in-residence in Seoul, South Korea in 1995. Since then she has regularly spent months at a time in South Korea teaching, exhibiting and consulting. She now divides her time between Seoul and Sydney.

Work
Living in different cultural contexts has led to the artist's preoccupation with displacement. The work becomes a response to Boag's own response to her new surroundings. Images are reduced to semi-abstract forms that combine areas of colour with line. The results are strong graphic forms which take on the character of signs. The pictures are simultaneously simple and complex. They become conversations between the artist and her context, reflecting the range of responses to being in a foreign place.

Collections
 Castlemaine Art Museum
 Geelong Gallery

Selected bibliography
 Acquisitions 1992, Bendigo Art Gallery, Bendigo Vic, Australia, 1992
  ArirangTV, Communicating through shapes, colors and lines in Mokpo, http://www.cultconv.com/yvonneboag/artravel2.html, 2019
 Art & Australia, September 2003
 Art World, Korea, August 1995
Asian Art in Australia, Bright Influence, in Profile Stories, https://asianartaustralia.wordpress.com, 27 April 2012
 Catalogue, 2eme Salon Cimaise, Dinan, France, 1993
 Catalogue, Discovery New Asia, Chung Ju Korea, 1993
 Chosun Ilbo, South Korea, May 1995
 Chung Chong Daily News, Korea, May 1995
 Cross, E., Exhibition Review, The Age, 22 February 1989
 Directory of Australian Printmakers 1982-1989, Print Council of Australia
 Douglas B, An Aboriginal exhibition of awakening, https://issuu.com/first_nations_telegraph/docs/an_aboriginal_exhibition_of_awakeni, January 2015
 Drury, N., Images 2 Contemporary Australian Painting, Craftsman House, 1994
 Exhibition: Yvonne Boag "Strange Associations". IY archives: interview (2013, http://illustrateyourself.com/news/entry/exhibition-yvonne-boag-strange-associations-2015, 2015
 Frost A, The uncanny and Changwon Sculpture Biennale, https://theconversation.com/the-uncanny-and-changwon-sculpture-biennale-66136, 2016
 Germaine, Max, Directory of Australian Artists
 Graven Images in the Promised Land, Art Gallery of South Australia, 1981
 Grishin S, Yvonne Boag s Here and There at Nancy Sever Gallery in Canberra a sensual exploration of Korea, http://www.canberratimes.com.au/act-news/canberra-life/yvonne-boags-here-and-there-at-nancy-sever-gallery-in-canberra-a-sensual-exploration-of-korea-20160901-gr6e6t.html, September 2016
 Grishin, S. (Ed), Australian Printmaking in the 1990s, Craftsman House, 1996
 Hankook Ilbo, South Korea, June 1995
 Kang Chul-Son's Cultural Journey to Australia, Korean Broadcasting Service, broadcast in June, 1996
 Korean Eyesed Exhibition Review (in Korean), http://www.ohmynews.com/NWS_Web/View/at_pg.aspx?CNTN_CD=A0000232240
 Korean Times, Korea, May 1995
 Korean-eyesed, Kwanhoon Gallery, Seoul Indesign, March 2003-12-08
 MBC, Radio Interview, 1800hrs, 27 May 1995
 McGillick, Paul, A voice of her own, Art & Australia Spring Vol 41 No. 1 2003
 New Art 3, Craftsman House Press 1989
 Petit Presse à Poing, Imprint Magazine, Vol 28, No. 1, 1993
 Point & Marge, Imprint Magazine, Vol 28, No. 3, 1993
 Scottish Painters in Australia Catalogue, Castlemaine Art Museum, Castlemaine Vic, Australia
 Watson, B., Artist Yvonne Boag finds inspiration in South Korea, The Australian, 3 September 2016, http://www.theaustralian.com.au/arts/review/artist-yvonne-boag-finds-inspiration-in-south-korea/news-story/ec23b523a38a48e57cbf8de1cc71b1d6

References

External links
 Personal web site
 National National Library of Australia TROVE profile
 Design & Art Australia Online profile
 Australian Centre for Australian Art, Prints + Printmaking profile
 Asia Asia Art Archive profile

1954 births
Living people
Australian women painters
Australian contemporary painters
Scottish emigrants to Australia
Artists from Glasgow
University of South Australia alumni
RMIT University alumni
Australian printmakers
Academic staff of Western Sydney University
Women printmakers
People from Port Pirie